Frederick Rowland Coulsell (born 17 December 1905, date of death unknown) was an Australian rules footballer who played with North Melbourne and Essendon in the Victorian Football League (VFL).

Family
The son of Frank Foster Coulsell (1872-1838), and Lydia Caroline Coulsell (1868-1926), née Van Damme, Frederick Rowland Coulsell was born at Essendon, Victoria on 17 December 1905.

He married Marjory Susan Griffiths (1901-1980) in 1937.

Notes

References
 
 Maplestone, M., Flying Higher: History of the Essendon Football Club 1872–1996, Essendon Football Club, (Melbourne), 1996. 
 Wells (Samuel Garnet Wells (1885-1972)), "Wells mixes with North's Tall Poppies", The Herald, (Friday, 20 May 1927), p.13.
 Umpire and Permit Committee, The Age, (Thursday, 19 April 1928), p.5.
 'Fair Play', "Fine High Mark: Fred Coulsell, of Yarraville", The Sporting Globe, (Saturday, 16 June 1928), p.6.
 Coulsell's Goals, The Sporting Globe, (Wednesday, 3 July 1930), p.9.

External links 
 
 
 Fred Coulsell, at The VFA Project

1905 births
Year of death missing
Australian rules footballers from Melbourne
North Melbourne Football Club players
Yarraville Football Club players
Oakleigh Football Club players
Essendon Football Club players
People from Essendon, Victoria